Reika Iwami (岩見 禮花 Iwami Reika, (born 1927 - March 18, 2020) was a Sōsaku-hanga woodblock printmaker who worked primarily with abstract compositions.

Biography 
Iwami was born in Tokyo in 1927 but raised in Kyushu. She later lived in Kanagawa. She studied part time at Bunka Gakuin, and then spent 11 years studying doll-making with Ryūjo Hori before turning her attention to printmaking in 1954.

She studied with Koshiro Onchi, a prominent founder of the Sōsaku-hanga movement.

Prints 
Iwami's prints frequently feature sumi black ink in solid geometric shapes combined with the organic texture of the wood grain, as well as deeply embossed paper and gold leaf.

In 1994, the art dealer Norman Tolman wrote of her work:"Iwami’s subject is water and its flow, and her genius lies in the almost mystical ability to transmute the grain and texture of pieces of wood she has found into visual images of patterns of water."In his 1962 book, The Modern Japanese Print - An Appreciation, James A. Michener described his first encounter with Iwami's prints, and mistaking the work for "another of the gifted young men who were knocking for admission to the ateliers of critical review". Michener concluded that "this Iwami, whoever he was, had already reached a point rather more advanced than competing artists who were just then appearing on the scene." Iwami was a prolific printmaker and among the first women printmakers in Japan to achieve recognition at the same level as her male colleagues.

Collections 
The following is a partial list of collections
 British Museum
Museum of Modern Art, Kamakura & Hayama
 MOMA
 Art Gallery of New South Wales
 Cincinnati Art Museum
 Library of Congress
Art Institute Chicago
Los Angeles County Museum of Art

Affiliations 
Japan Print Association

References 

1927 births
2020 deaths
Japanese women artists
Japanese printmakers
Sosaku hanga artists
Women graphic designers
People from Tokyo